Ptychadena erlangeri is a species of frog in the family Ptychadenidae.
It is endemic to Ethiopia.

Its natural habitats are subtropical or tropical moist montane forest, freshwater marshes, and intermittent freshwater marshes.
It is threatened by habitat loss.

References

Ptychadena
Amphibians of Ethiopia
Endemic fauna of Ethiopia
Taxonomy articles created by Polbot
Amphibians described in 1924